Blessing Avbenayeri Erifeta (born 17 April 1964) is the incumbent Bishop of Sapele in the Anglican Province of Bendel in the Church of Nigeria.

Erifeta is a graduate of Immanuel College of Theology, Ibadan; Delta State University, Abraka (B.A (Ed) Hons, 2004); National Open University of Nigeria (M.Sc. PCR) and Crowther Graduate Theology Seminary, Abeokuta ((M.Div) 2011).

He was installed as the first Bishop of the Anglican Diocese of Sapele on 12 January 2009.

Erifeta was involved in a long-running dispute in 2015 and 2016 with his parishioners over alleged financial irregularities. Erifeta received the support of Nicholas Okoh, 
the primate of the Church of Nigeria, on 23 March 2017.

References

Living people
Anglican bishops of Sapele
21st-century Anglican bishops in Nigeria
Alumni of Immanuel College of Theology, Ibadan
Delta State University, Abraka alumni
National Open University of Nigeria alumni
1964 births